The 14th Test Squadron is a United States Air Force unit located at Schriever Air Force Base, Colorado.  It is an Air Force Reserve unit that augments the 17th Test Squadron.  The squadron is responsible for testing and evaluating space systems and associated support equipment.  The unit was originally established in 1972 as the 14th Missile Warning Squadron.  The missile warning squadron was an active duty unit that operated early warning radars at eight locations around the United States until it was inactivated in 1980.  The squadron was reactivated and given its current space test mission in 2000.

Mission

Cold War
The 14th Missile Warning Squadron was constituted on 17 April 1972 and activated on 8 July 1972. The unit was assigned to the Fourteenth Aerospace Force. Its primary mission was detecting and tracking intercontinental ballistic missiles and sea-launched ballistic missiles. The squadron was also responsible for tracking satellites that passed over the United States.

The squadron operated radars at eight geographically separated locations around the United States.  The radar sites began operating in the mid-1960s under other command elements, but were brought together into one squadron when the 14th Missile Warning Squadron was established in 1972.  Seven of the sited operated the AN/FSS-7 missile warning radar (also known as a Fuzzy-7 radar), a modified version of the AN/FPS-26 height-finder radar.  One radar site (Moorestown) operated a prototype AN/FPS-49 missile-warning radar.  The 14th Missile Warning Squadron was inactivated in 1980.

Today
The mission of the 14th Test Squadron is to enhance warfighting capabilities of Air Force Space Command by testing and evaluating space assets.  To accomplish this, unit personnel provide long-term continuity and technical expertise to active duty test managers conducting operational tests on new space systems.  The squadron also supports specific test operations at Cheyenne Mountain Complex and information assurance testing throughout Air Force Space Command.

Organization

Cold War

The 14th Missile Warning Squadron was assigned to the 14th Aerospace Force from 8 July 1972 to 30 September 1976.  It was then assigned to Aerospace Defense Command from 1 October 1976 to 30 November 1979.  Finally, it was assigned to 42d Air Division of Strategic Air Command from 1 December 1979 until the unit was inactivated on 1 October 1980.

The squadron was originally stationed at Laredo Air Force Base, Texas.  It was located there from 8 July 1972 until the base closed 1 January 1974.  In 1975, the squadron moved to MacDill Air Force Base, Florida.  The squadron was located at MacDill from 30 June 1975 until the unit was inactivated in 1980.

The 14th Missile Warning Squadron's eight detachments were located along the east and west coasts of the United States.  The warning radars were at:

 Detachment 1 was located at Moorestown, New Jersey.  It was activated on 8 July 1972.  The detachment operated AN/FPS-49 prototype radar; maintained by RCA under contract to the Air Force.  It was inactivated on 31 March 1975.
 Detachment 2 was located at Mount Hebo Air Force Station, Oregon.  It was activated on 8 July 1972.  The detachment operated an AN/FPS-26A radar modified to AN/FSS-7 radar.  It was inactivated on 15 September 1980.

 Detachment 3 was located at Mill Valley Air Force Station, California.  It was activated on 8 July 1972.  The detachment operated an AN/FPS-26A radar modified to AN/FSS-7 radar.  It was inactivated on 15 September 1980.
 Detachment 4 was located at Mount Laguna Air Force Station, California.  It was activated on 8 July 1972.  the detachment operated an AN/FPS-26A radar modified to AN/FSS-7 radar.  It was discontinued on 15 September 1980.
 Detachment 5 was located at Fort Fisher Air Force Station, North Carolina.  It was activated on 8 July 1972.  The detachment operated an AN/FPS-26A radar modified to AN/FSS-7 radar.  It was discontinued on 1 July 1980.
 Detachment 6 was located at Charleston Air Force Station, Maine.  It was activated on 8 July 1972.  The detachment operated an AN/FPS-26A radar modified to AN/FSS-7 radar.  It was discontinued on 1 July 1980.
 Detachment 7 was located at MacDill Air Force Base, Florida.  It was activated on 8 July 1972.  The detachment operated an AN/FPS-26A radar modified to AN/FSS-7 radar.  It was discontinued on 31 August 1980.
 Detachment 8 was located at Laredo Missile Tracking Site, Texas.  It was activated on 8 July 1972.  The detachment operated an AN/FSS-7 radar which was installed in its final configuration.  The radar was not modified from a previously installed AN/FPS-26.  It was discontinued on 30 June 1975.

Today
The 14th Test Squadron is an Air Force Reserve squadron.  Its personnel augment the 17th Test Squadron, its active duty counterpart unit.  The two units cooperate on many test and evaluation efforts, providing senior Air Force leaders with an independent assessment of new space systems.  Since the acquisition process for space systems can take several years, reservists from the 14th Test Squadron provide program continuity.  Reservists also bring unique expertise and extensive experience to complex test and evaluation programs they support.

The squadron has three flights that provide operational test and evaluation support to Air Force Space Command and major commands.

 The Weapons and Surveillance Flight is located at Cheyenne Mountain Air Force Station, Colorado.  Its personnel test the Integrated Tactical Warning and Attack Assessment System, which provides real-time threat information to the National Command Authority.  This flight directly supports the homeland defense mission of North American Aerospace Defense Command and the United States Northern Command.
 The Information Assurance Flight is located at Schriever Air Force Base, Colorado.  The flight conducts information assurance assessments of space systems.  Its personnel use their expertise in networking, operating systems, databases, and information assurance controls to identify space system vulnerabilities for Air Force Space Command units.
 The Evaluation and Assessment Flight is located at Schriever Air Force Base.  It supports rapid delivery of new space systems.  The flight uses innovative non-traditional management techniques to help expedite the delivery of space assets.

Redesignation 
On 1 October 2000, the Air Force reactivated the unit as the 14th Test Squadron.  The mission of the 14th Test Squadron is to test and evaluate of space assets for Air Force Space Command.  To accomplish this, unit personnel provide long-term continuity and technical expertise to active duty test managers conducting operational tests on new space systems.  The squadron also supports specific test operations at Cheyenne Mountain Complex.

The 14th Test Squadron is an Air Force Reserve squadron.  The unit supports its active duty counterpart, the 17th Test Squadron.  The two units cooperate on many test efforts, providing senior Air Force leaders with an independent assessment of new space systems.  Since the acquisition process for space systems can take several years, reservists from the 14th Test Squadron provide continuity to long-term test and evaluation programs.

The 14th Test Squadron is located at Schriever Air Force Base, Colorado.  The squadron is assigned to the 310th Operations Group.  The squadron has three flights.  The Weapons and Surveillance Flight is located at Cheyenne Mountain Air Force Station, Colorado.  Its personnel test the Integrated Tactical Warning and Attack Assessment System, which provides real-time threat information to the National Command Authority.  The Information Assurance Flight is located at Schriever Air Force Base.  The flight conducts information assurance assessments of space systems.  Its personnel use their expertise in networking, operating systems, databases, and information assurance controls to identify space system vulnerabilities for Air Force Space Command.  The Evaluation and Assessment Flight is also located at Schriever Air Force Base.  It supports rapid delivery of new space systems.  The flight uses non-traditional management techniques to help expedite the delivery of space assets.

Lineage
 Constituted as the 14th Missile Warning Squadron on 17 April 1972
 Activated on 8 July 1972
 Inactivated on 1 October 1980
 Redesignated 14th Test Squadron on 10 March 2000
 Activated on 1 October 2000

Assignments
 Fourteenth Aerospace Force, 8 July 1972
 Aerospace Defense Command, 1 October 1976
 42d Air Division, 1 December 1979 – 1 October 1980
 310th Space Group, 1 October 2000
 310th Operations Group 7 March 2008 – present

Stations
 Laredo Air Force Base, Texas, 8 July 1972
 Laredo, Texas, 1 January 1974
 MacDill Air Force Base, Florida, 30 June 1975 – 1 October 1980
 Schriever Air Force Base, Colorado, 1 October 2000 – present

Awards

See also 
17th Test Squadron – Active duty counterpart to 14th Test Squadron
Mount Hebo Air Force Station – Detachment location
Mill Valley Air Force Station – Detachment location
Mount Laguna Air Force Station – Detachment location
Fort Fisher Air Force Station – Detachment location
Charleston Air Force Station – Detachment location
United States general surveillance radar stations

References

Notes

Bibliography

External links 
Air Force Link
United States Historical Research Agency
Online Air Defense Radar Museum

0014
Military units and formations in Colorado
Organizations based in Colorado Springs, Colorado